Milbourne is a village and former civil parish  from Morpeth, now in the parish of Ponteland, in the county of Northumberland, England. In 1951 the parish had a population of 70. Milbourne has a church called Holy Saviour.

History 
The name "Milbourne" means 'Mill stream'. From 1866 Milbourne was a civil parish in its own right until it was merged with Ponteland on 1 April 1955. A chapel was recorded in Milbourne in 1202 but its location has been lost and was last recorded in 1575.

See also 
 Milbourne Hall

References 

Villages in Northumberland
Former civil parishes in Northumberland